Glassford (locally known as The Glesart ) is a small village located  south of Hamilton, and  north-east of Strathaven, in South Lanarkshire, Scotland. It has a population of roughly 500–600 people. Features include the 19th-century Parish Church, and the remains of the 17th-century church, both of which are category B listed buildings. The Avon Water offers fishing and walks. Local businesses include the Glassford Inn and the Fortune Dragon Chinese restaurant. the village is also famous for the annual Beer and gin Festival held on the last saturday in March,  The local No.13 or No 256 bus service comes through the village once every hour.

People from Glassford

Rev James Struthers
Peter Wedderburn, Lord Chesterhall

References

External links

 Glassford Parish Church
 Glassford Primary

Villages in South Lanarkshire